Christián Steinhübel (born 2 October 1994) is a Slovak footballer who plays as a midfielder for MFK Tatran Liptovský Mikuláš.

Club career
He made his Corgoň liga for Dunajská Streda on 19 October 2013 against Senica.

References

External links
Futbalnet profile
Corgoň Liga profile

Eurofotbal profile
UEFA profile

1994 births
Living people
People from Modra
Sportspeople from the Bratislava Region
Slovak footballers
Slovak expatriate footballers
Association football midfielders
FC Spartak Trnava players
FK Dubnica players
FC DAC 1904 Dunajská Streda players
FC Nitra players
FK Pohronie players
FK Fotbal Třinec players
ŠKF Sereď players
MFK Tatran Liptovský Mikuláš players
Slovak Super Liga players
2. Liga (Slovakia) players
Austrian Regionalliga players
Czech National Football League players
Slovak expatriate sportspeople in Austria
Expatriate footballers in Austria
Slovak expatriate sportspeople in the Czech Republic
Expatriate footballers in the Czech Republic
Slovakia youth international footballers